Two partial lunar eclipses occurred in 1961: 

 2 March 1961 lunar eclipse
 26 August 1961 lunar eclipse

See also 
 List of 20th-century lunar eclipses
 Lists of lunar eclipses